Auden railway station is located in the community of Auden, Ontario, Canada. This station is currently in use by Via Rail. Transcontinental Canadian trains stop here.

External links
 Auden railway station

Via Rail stations in Ontario
Railway stations in Thunder Bay District
Canadian National Railway stations in Ontario